Kerasea or Kerasia may refer to several villages in Greece:

Kerasea, Aetolia-Acarnania, a village in the municipal unit Panaitoliko, Aetolia-Acarnania
Kerasia, Arcadia, a village in the municipal unit Skiritida, Arcadia 
Kerasia, Euboea, a village in the municipal unit Nileas, Euboea 
Kerasea, Ioannina, a village in the municipal unit Selloi, Ioannina regional unit
Kerasea, Karditsa, a village in the municipal unit Plastiras, Karditsa regional unit
Kerasea, Kozani, a village in the municipal unit Aiani, Kozani regional unit
Kerasia, Magnesia, a village in the municipal unit Karla, Magnesia
Kerasia, Mount Athos, a settlement in Mount Athos
Kerasea, Rhodope, a village in the municipal unit Sostis, Rhodope regional unit
Megali Kerasea, a village in the municipal unit Kalampaka, Trikala regional unit
Nea Kerasia, a village in the municipal unit Michaniona, Thessaloniki regional unit